is a tokusatsu kaiju fan film shot on 16mm by Daicon Films (now Gainax).  It was released in December 1985 and runs at 72 minutes.  This was the most heavily promoted of Daicon's fan films.  It was so successful that it was released on video by Bandai/Emotion.  This film was also a turning point for the career of special effects director Shinji Higuchi.

This film was Daicon's epic parody of the many classic daikaiju (giant monster) films, and featured a more biomechanical-looking version of the mythical eight-headed serpent, the Orochi.  This one was created by aliens, which had invaded Earth in ancient times.  2000 years later, they dispatch the Orochi again to destroy Japan and the rest of the world.  Only a team of the Japan Self-Defense Forces and a scientist (two other staples in the daikaiju genre), can destroy it.

Cast
Akiko Kirihara - Kakumi Takahashi
Shunsaku Tako - Tatsuto Nagayama
Tank Corps General Yoshikawa - Kenichiro Mera
Captain Mouri - Yasuhiro Takeda

Staff
Producer: Takeshi Sawamura
Director: Takami Akai
Director of Special Effects: Shinji Higuchi
Writers: Takami Akai, Aiko Ito
Miniatures design: Hideaki Anno

References

1985 films
Fan films
Kaiju films
Gainax
Films set in Tottori Prefecture
1980s Japanese films